Michael Frank Goodchild (born February 24, 1944) is a British-American geographer. He is an Emeritus Professor of Geography at the University of California, Santa Barbara. After nineteen years at the University of Western Ontario, including three years as chair, he moved to Santa Barbara in 1988, as part of the establishment of the National Center for Geographic Information and Analysis, which he directed for over 20 years. In 2008, he founded the UCSB Center for Spatial Studies.

Education
Ph.D., Geography, McMaster University, Hamilton, Ontario, 1969 
B.A., Physics, Downing College, Cambridge, Cambridge, England, 1965

Scholarship
His most influential work has involved research on Geographic Information Science (aka GIS).  He is widely credited with coining "Volunteered Geographic Information" and is considered the world's foremost expert on the topic.

Caves and karst
As a doctoral student at McMaster University, Goodchild rediscovered Castleguard Cave (20 kilometers long, the longest cave in Canada). His student Alan Glennon discovered an entrance and made significant discoveries to the Martin Ridge Cave System, Kentucky (51.8 kilometers long). Goodchild's dissertation advisor, Derek C. Ford, is a Canadian geomorphologist and karst scientist.

Honors
 Fellow of the British Academy, 2010 – 
 Foreign Member of the Royal Society, 2010– 
 Researcher of the Year, University Consortium for Geographic Information Science, 2010;
 Prix Vautrin Lud, St Dié-des-Vosges, France, 2007;
 Member, American Academy of Arts and Sciences, 2006–;
 Honorary Doctor of Laws, Ryerson University, 2004;
 Honorary Doctor of Science, McMaster University, 2004;
 Professor, Wuhan University, 2003–;
 Faculty Research Lecturer, University of California, Santa Barbara, 2003;
 Founder's Medal, Royal Geographical Society, 2003;
 Educator of the Year, University Consortium for Geographic Information Science, 2002;
 Foreign Fellow, Royal Society of Canada, 2002–; 
 Member, National Academy of Sciences, 2002–; 
 National Associate of the National Academies, 2001–; 
 Lifetime Achievement Award, Environmental Systems Research Institute (ESRI), 2001; 
 Honorary Doctor of Science, Keele University, 2001; 
 Award of Distinction for Exceptional Scholarly Contributions to Cartography, Canadian Cartographic Association, 1999; 
 Honorary Doctor of Science, Université Laval, 1999.

References

External links

Mike Goodchild's homepage

1944 births
Living people
Alumni of Downing College, Cambridge
McMaster University alumni
British geographers
Fellows of the American Academy of Arts and Sciences
Members of the United States National Academy of Sciences
American geographers
Recipients of the Vautrin Lud International Geography Prize
University of California, Santa Barbara faculty
Foreign Members of the Royal Society
Fellows of the British Academy
Geographic information scientists
Recipients of the Royal Geographical Society Founder's Medal
Corresponding Fellows of the British Academy